Raleigh Moncrief is an American electronic musician, record producer and recording engineer who has worked with Zach Hill, Dirty Projectors and !!!.

History

The debut album, Watered Lawn, was released on Anticon in 2011.

Discography

Albums
 Watered Lawn (Anticon, 2011)

EPs
 Combed Over Chrome (2009)
 Carpal Tunnels (2010)
 Vitamins (2010)
 4-Way Split (2010) with Ellie Fortune, Mason Lindahl, Zach Hill
 "Dusted" (Anticon, 2013)

Remixes
 Tera Melos - "Frozen Zoo (Raleigh Moncrief Remix)" from "Frozen Zoo" (2010)
 Dirty Projectors - "Cool Your Heart (Raleigh Moncrief Remix)" from "Cool Your Heart (Remixes)" (Domino Records, 2017)

References

External links
 Official website

Living people
Anticon
Year of birth missing (living people)